Björn Böhning (born 2 June 1978) is a German politician of the Social Democratic Party (SPD) who has been serving as State Secretary at the Federal Ministry of Labour and Social Affairs under the leadership of minister Hubertus Heil from 2018 to 2022.

From 2004 to 2007 Böhning was the chairperson of the Young Socialists in the SPD ("Jusos"), the SPD's youth organization.

Early life and educations 
Böhning was born in Geldern and grew up in Lübeck. He studied political science at the Otto Suhr Institute (OSI) of the Free University of Berlin from 1999 until 2004.

Political career 
From 15 February 2008 Böhning served as spokesperson of the "Forum Demokratische Linke 21" of the SPD, a group of left-aligned politicians within the party; in 2014, he left the group. He unsuccessfully ran as candidate for the electoral district of Berlin-Friedrichshain-Kreuzberg – Prenzlauer Berg East in the 2009 national elections.

From December 2011 Böhning served as Head of the Senate Chancellery of the Federal State of Berlin, first under Governing Mayor Klaus Wowereit (2011–2014) and later under Michael Müller (2014–2018). In the negotiations to form a Grand Coalition of Chancellor Angela Merkel's Christian Democrats (CDU together with the Bavarian CSU) and the SPD following the 2013 German elections, he was part of the SPD delegation in the working group on digital policy, led by Dorothee Bär and Brigitte Zypries.

In the fourth coalition government of Chancellor Angela Merkel, Böhning has been serving as State Secretary at the Federal Ministry of Labour and Social Affairs under the leadership of minister Hubertus Heil since 2018.

Other activities 
 Business Forum of the Social Democratic Party of Germany, Member of the Political Advisory Board (since 2020)
 German Film and Television Academy (DFFB), Chairman of the Board of Trustees
 Deutsche Kinemathek, Member of the Board of Trustees
 Deutschlandradio, Member of the Supervisory Board
 German Federal Film Board (FFA), Member of the Supervisory Board
 Medienboard Berlin-Brandenburg, Member of the Supervisory Board
 Villa Aurora, Member of the Board of Trustees
 Checkpoint Charlie Foundation, Chairman of the Board of Trustees
 spw – Zeitschrift für sozialistische Politik und Wirtschaft, Member of the Editorial Board
 2017 German Computer Games Award, Member of the Jury

Personal life 
Böhning has been married since 2008.

See also 
List of Social Democratic Party of Germany politicians

References 

1978 births
Living people
People from Geldern
Free University of Berlin alumni
Social Democratic Party of Germany politicians